Princess Marie Louise Ferdinande Charlotte Henriette of Orléans (31 December 1896 – 8 March 1973) was a Princess of Orléans by birth and a Princess of Bourbon-Two Sicilies through her marriage to Prince Philip of Bourbon-Two Sicilies.

Family
Princess Marie Louise was born on 31 December 1896 in Neuilly-sur-Seine, Île-de-France, France. She was the eldest daughter and child of Prince Emmanuel of Orléans, Duke of Vendôme and his wife, Princess Henriette of Belgium.

Her paternal grandparents were Prince Ferdinand, Duke of Alençon and Duchess Sophie Charlotte in Bavaria and her maternal grandparents were Prince Philippe, Count of Flanders and Princess Marie of Hohenzollern-Sigmaringen. She was a great-granddaughter of Leopold I, the first king of Belgium, and a great-great-granddaughter of Louis Philippe I, the last king of France.

Marriage and issue
Marie Louise married firstly to Prince Philip of Bourbon-Two Sicilies, tenth child of Prince Alfonso of Bourbon-Two Sicilies, Count of Caserta, and his wife, Princess Antonietta of Bourbon-Two Sicilies, on 12 January 1916 at her father's home in Neuilly-sur-Seine. The couple had one child before their divorce in 1925:

 Prince Gaetano Maria Alfonso Enrico Paolo of Bourbon-Two Sicilies (1917–1984), who married Olivia Yarrow, a daughter of Lt.-Cdr. Charles A. Yarrow, on 16 February 1946, and had two sons.

Marie Louise married secondly to Walter F. Kingsland Jr., a prominent New York businessman, on 12 December 1928 in Chichester, Sussex, England. His father owned a "palatial home in the Bois de Boulogne" and his grandfather was Ambrose Kingsland, the former Mayor of New York City. Marie Louise and Walter did not have children, and lived in Redding, Connecticut, for twenty years.

Marie Louise died on 8 March 1973 in New York City.

Descendants
Through her only son Prince Gaetano, she was the grandmother of two grandsons: Adrian Philip de Bourbon (b. 1948), who married Linda Idensohn on 20 March 1976, and Gregory Peter de Bourbon (b. 1950), who married, firstly, Maureen Powell on 15 May 1971. They divorced in 1986. They have two sons. He remarried to Carrie Anne Thornley on 30 August 1986.

Gallery

Ancestry

References
Notes

Sources

1896 births
1973 deaths
People from Neuilly-sur-Seine
Princesses of France (Orléans)
Princesses of Bourbon-Two Sicilies